Varbevere is a village in Jõgeva Parish, Jõgeva County in Estonia. Varbevere has a population of 63 (as of 1 January 2011).

References

Villages in Jõgeva County